The 1963 Wimbledon Championships took place on the outdoor grass courts at the All England Lawn Tennis and Croquet Club in Wimbledon, London, United Kingdom. It was the 77th staging of the Wimbledon Championships, and the third Grand Slam tennis event of 1963. The tournament which was scheduled from 24 June until 6 July was played in cold and wet weather conditions. Play on the final Saturday was cancelled due to rain and the women's singles, the men's and women's doubles and the mixed doubles finals were concluded on Monday, 8 July. This edition of the tournament saw the introduction of the regulation that player's clothing must be predominantly white.

Champions

Seniors

Men's singles

 Chuck McKinley defeated  Fred Stolle, 9–7, 6–1, 6–4

Women's singles

 Margaret Smith defeated  Billie Jean Moffitt, 6–3, 6–4

Men's doubles

 Rafael Osuna /  Antonio Palafox defeated  Jean-Claude Barclay /  Pierre Darmon, 4–6, 6–2, 6–2, 6–2

Women's doubles

 Maria Bueno /  Darlene Hard defeated  Robyn Ebbern /  Margaret Smith, 8–6, 9–7

Mixed doubles

 Ken Fletcher /  Margaret Smith defeated  Bob Hewitt /  Darlene Hard, 11–9, 6–4

Juniors

Boys' singles

 Nicholas Kalogeropoulos defeated  Ismail El Shafei, 6–4, 6–3

Girls' singles

 Monique Salfati defeated  Kaye Dening, 6–4, 6–1

Notes

References

External links
 Official Wimbledon Championships website

 
Wimbledon Championships
Wimbledon Championships
Wimbledon Championships
Wimbledon Championships